The Zigeunerlieder (Gypsy songs), Op. 103 and Op. 112 Nos. 3–6, are a song cycle for four singers (or choir) and piano by Johannes Brahms (Op. 103 Nos. 1–7 and 11 exist also in an arrangement for solo voice and piano made by Brahms himself). The texts are Hungarian folk songs in German adaptation by Hugo Conrat (originally Hugo Cohn, 1845–1906), a member of Brahms’ circle in Vienna. The first translation of the texts was by the Hungarian nurse of the Conrat family.

History 

The first eleven pieces of the cycle, which formed some well-connected story, were put to music by Brahms either in his Thun summer of 1887 or in winter 1887/88 straight-away during a stay in Budapest.

In Brahms's total work the Zigeunerlieder  can be seen – on the one hand – as a vocal counterpart of the Hungarian Dances and – on the other hand – as exotic counterpart to the more-referenced Liebesliederwalzer Opp. 52 and 65.

The first public performance of the songs Op. 103 was on 31 October 1888 in Berlin, with great success, although the presentation of the opus in a concert hall presented some bad feelings to the composer, since Brahms had conceived his opus genuinely for soloist quartets, and had thought of performances at home. Nonetheless, the songs are also suited for (small) choirs, particularly in connection with the voluminous sound of modern pianos. As a consequence, performances by choirs in concert  are now the rule. CD-representations are, instead, frequently performed by soloists.

List of songs 

Zigeunerlieder, Op. 103
 He, Zigeuner, greife in die Saiten
 Hochgetürmte Rimaflut
 Wißt ihr, wann mein Kindchen
 Lieber Gott, du weißt
 Brauner Bursche führt zum Tanze
 Röslein dreie in der Reihe
 Kommt dir manchmal in den Sinn
 Horch, der Wind klagt in den Zweigen
 Weit und breit schaut niemand mich an
 Mond verhüllt sein Angesicht
 Rote Abendwolken ziehn

Vier Zigeunerlieder, Op. 112
 Himmel strahlt so helle
 Rote Rosenknospen künden
 Brennessel steht an Weges Rand
 Liebe Schwalbe, kleine Schwalbe

References

Literature 
 Hans Gebhard, ed.: Harenberg Chormusikführer. Harenberg, Dortmund 1999, .

External links 
 
 
 Zigeunerlieder: MIDI/MP3-Format, with exercises for members of a choir
 Zigeunerlieder op. 103: Texts and translations at the LiederNet Archive
 Vier Zigeunerlieder op. 112: Texts and translations at the LiederNet Archive

Song cycles by Johannes Brahms
Classical song cycles in German